Aridane Jesús Santana Cabrera (born 31 March 1987), known simply as Aridane, is a Spanish professional footballer who plays as a striker for CD Atlético Paso.

Club career
Born in Vecindario, Province of Las Palmas, Canary Islands, Aridane finished his youth career with Deportivo de La Coruña, making his senior debut with the B team in the Tercera División. He achieved promotion to Segunda División B in 2007, being relegated two years later.

In the following years, Aridane did not settle with any team, representing Deportivo Aragón in the fourth tier and Universidad de Las Palmas CF and CD Leganés in the third. In January 2012, he signed with CD Tenerife in the latter league, scoring 25 goals in 37 games in his second season (adding two from three appearances in the play-offs) to help the club return to the Segunda División after two years out.

Aridane played his first professional match on 1 September 2013, featuring the last 27 minutes of a 2–0 away loss to CD Mirandés. He scored his first goal seven days later, in a 2–2 home draw against FC Barcelona Atlètic.

On 6 July 2015, aged 28, Aridane terminated his contract with Tenerife and moved abroad for the first time in his career, after agreeing to a two-year deal with Bangkok Glass F.C. in Thailand. On 1 February of the following year he returned to his home country, signing a short-term deal with CD Mirandés in the second division.

On 3 August 2016, Aridane joined Albacete Balompié, recently relegated to the third tier. In his first season in Castilla-La Mancha, he contributed 17 goals in 42 matches as his team were promoted as champions, including the extra time winner in the play-off semi-final against CD Atlético Baleares.

Aridane competed in the Indian Super League from 2019 to 2021, representing Odisha FC and Hyderabad FC.

References

External links

1987 births
Living people
People from Gran Canaria
Sportspeople from the Province of Las Palmas
Spanish footballers
Footballers from the Canary Islands
Association football forwards
Segunda División players
Segunda División B players
Tercera División players
Primera Federación players
Segunda Federación players
Deportivo Fabril players
Real Zaragoza B players
Universidad de Las Palmas CF footballers
CD Leganés players
CD Tenerife players
CD Mirandés footballers
Albacete Balompié players
Cultural Leonesa footballers
UD Logroñés players
Thai League 1 players
BG Pathum United F.C. players
Indian Super League players
Odisha FC players
Hyderabad FC players
Spanish expatriate footballers
Expatriate footballers in Thailand
Expatriate footballers in India
Spanish expatriate sportspeople in Thailand
Spanish expatriate sportspeople in India